Archetype | 1989-1995 Polydor years of Hirasawa (tentatively titled Best of Polydor years) is Susumu Hirasawa's fourth compilation album.

Overview
Released as part of "Project Archetype", a Universal catalog reissue program made to commemorate the 25th anniversary of Hirasawa's debut as a solo artist, the album was part of the first wave of the project, alongside reissues of Hirasawa's first three albums. Polydor years is a spiritual successor to Polydor's ESSENCE OF HIRASAWA SOLO WORKS 1992 compilation (with the exception of the Water in Time and Space song "Skeleton Coast Park" and the original mix of "Bandiria Travellers", the entire ESSENCE OF HIRASAWA SOLO WORKS selection is present here), expanded with digitally remastered tracks released after that compilation.

Hirasawa himself had no involvement with the making of the album or the whole reissue project, but his associates were. The project was spearheaded by Osamu Takeuchi, a former Polydor employee whose first job with the company was as assistant director on Water in Time and Space (he kept his position on all subsequent Hirasawa Polydor releases, and was part of some of the impromptu chorus section that Hirasawa formed for certain songs). Kasiko Takahasi, whose Fascination company published Hirasawa's "Music Industrial Wastes" & "Near Future Never Come" books, was brought in to supervise. Masanori Chinzei, who has engineered every single Hirasawa release since 1991 supervised Universal's mastering process. Toshifumi Nakai, who designs Hirasawa's album sleeves (under the moniker "non graph") did the art direction. Takahasi, as well as Akiro "Kamio" Arishima (leader of The Bach Revolution, founder of AC Unit and holder of a 16-years long on-and-off creative partnership with Hirasawa), Yasuhiro Nakano (Disk Union manager that assisted Hirasawa in creating the SYUN label, later on funded the new wave shop Mecano) and Susumu Kunisaki (editor of Sound & Recording Magazine) all wrote of their experiences with Hirasawa's work under Polydor, which were made into new liner notes for the albums.

Polydor years consists of two thematic discs, disc 1 has songs that were important in shaping Hirasawa's pop style, disc 2 has single releases and compilation/non-instrumental soundtrack songs (including one that was made before Hirasawa signed with Polydor, but whose original label ended up being acquired by Universal). With the exception of 2 tracks, Hirasawa's soundtrack work is omitted from this compilation, as it was set to be released as its own compilation, Symphonic Code.

The album comes with a 32 page long color booklet, which contains a large essay by Sound & Recording Magazine editor Susumu Kunisaki, the cover is the photograph used on the inner part of the ESSENCE OF HIRASAWA SOLO WORKS tray card, with slivers of Hirasawa's first 5 main albums overlaid on it. The booklet is adorned with album artwork photo session outtakes of the albums covered on the compilation.

Track listing

Personnel
Susumu Hirasawa - Vocals, Acoustic guitars, Bass guitars, Classical guitars, Electric guitars, Timpani, Percussion, Crumhorn, Autoharp, Toy Accordion, Synthesizers, Drum machines, Samplers, Amigas, Vista, Sequencers, Computer programming/Programming

Additional musicians
Shingo Tomoda - Drums on "Frozen Beach", "Venus" and "Fish Song, Percussion on "Fish Song"
Minoru Yoshizawa - Crumhorn on "Haldyn Hotel"
Kayo "Kokubo" Matsumoto - Voice on "Techno Girl", Acoustic Piano on "Water in Time and Space (Full Size)"
Midori Ayabe, Hiroki Yamamoto, Nagisa Kiriyama and Yoshiaki Funayama - Violin on "Techno Girl" and "Fish Song"
Kaori Kurimaru and Rika Morozumi - Viola on "Techno Girl" and "Fish Song"
Hirohisa Miyata and Makoto Ohsawa - Cello on "Techno Girl" and "Fish Song"
Jun Togawa - Vocals on "Clear Mountain Top"
Kathoey (uncredited) - Voice on "Archetype Engine", "Kingdom" and "Pacific Rim Imitation Network"
Tuan Chin Kuan - Voice (Sampled) on "World Turbine"
Kaoru Kinjo - Vocals on "World Turbine"
Teru Uchida Strings - Strings on "Bandiria Travellers"
Asuka Kaneko's Section - Strings (Violin, Cello, Viola, Contrabass) on "Root of Spirit"
Kazuhide "Kitune" Akimoto - Bass on "Fish Song"
Ainu (uncredited) - Voice on "Kamui Mintara"
Wakako Shimazaki - Vocals on "Christmas in Africa"

Backing vocalists
Akiro "Kamio" Arishima, Michäel Saturnus and Hisayuki Makanae - "Haldyn Hotel"/"Fractal Terrain Track"
Kazuhide "Kitune" Akimoto and Masahiro Furukawa - "Haldyn Hotel"/"Fractal Terrain Track" and "Rocket"
Jun Togawa, Yūichi Hirasawa, Katsuhiko Akiyama, Yūji Oda, Shigeru Fujishima - "Rocket"
Yūichi Kenjo and Osamu Takeuchi - "Rocket", "Virtual Rabbit" and "Clear Mountain Top"
Masanori Chinzei and Chūju Yamaguchi - "Virtual Rabbit" and "Clear Mountain Top"
THE GROOVERS (Yasuchika Fujii, Kazuhiko Fujii and Toshihiko "BOB" Takahashi) - "Clear Mountain Top"
Tokyo Philharmonic Chorus - "Bandiria Travellers"

Technical staff
Susumu Hirasawa, Yasushi Ide, Akiro "Kamio" Arishima, Yūichi Kenjo - Production
Yoshiaki Kondo, Masanori Chinzei - Engineering
Kiyoshi Inagaki - Art director

Reissue staff
Osamu Takeuchi - Music Supervision
Kasiko Takahasi - Supervision
Masanori Chinzei - Remastering Supervision
Kenji Yoshino - Remastering
Akiro "Kamio" Arishima, Yasuhiro Nakano, Kasiko Takahasi, Susumu Kunisaki - Liner notes
Toshifumi Nakai - Art direction

References

External links
 Archetype 1989－1995 Polydor years of Hirasawa at Universal Music Japan's official site
 Archetype 1989-1995 Polydor years of Hirasawa at iTunes Japan
 Archetype | 1989-1995 Polydor years of Hirasawa at RecoChoku
 Archetype | 1989-1995 Polydor years of Hirasawa at amazon.co.jp
 Archetype at Tower Records Online

Susumu Hirasawa albums
Japanese-language albums
2014 compilation albums
Universal Music Japan albums